Frank Millier-Smith was a former Australian professional soccer player who played as a forward and was an international player for the Australia national soccer team in 1924.

International career
Millier-Smith began his international career in an outside left position with Australia in June 1924 on their historic tour against Canada, debuting in a 3–2 win over Canada He played his second and last match for Australia in a 1–0 win over Canada.

Career statistics

International

References

Australian soccer players
Association football forwards
Australia international soccer players
1889 births
Year of death missing